On 18 January 2015, an Antonov An-26 operated by the Syrian Air Force crashed with no survivors while attempting to land at the besieged Abu al-Duhur military airport in Idlib Governorate, Syria. The plane was carrying troops as well as military equipment and ammunition. There were 35 people on board, 30 Syrian soldiers and 5 Iranian military experts.

Syrian state media and the SOHR said that the crash was due to heavy fog or "technical issues" and that the plane hit an electricity pylon. However, Al-Qaeda affiliated group Al-Nusra Front claimed that they shot it down.

Syrian media provided a list with the names of the 30 Syrian soldiers who were killed. The commander of the Syrian army division, Colonel Hussein Al-Yousif, was among those listed killed. Per SOHR, 13 Syrian officers were among the fatalities.

References

Aviation accidents and incidents in Syria
Accidents and incidents involving the Antonov An-26
Accidents and incidents involving military aircraft
Syrian Air Force An-26 crash
Syrian Air Force involvement in the Syrian civil war
January 2015 events in Syria
2015 disasters in Syria